Georg Bilgeri (11 October 1873 – 4 December 1934) was an officer in the Austro–Hungarian Army, mountaineer, and Austrian pioneer of skiing. Bilgeri learned to ski in Gargellen about 1893.

Military career
As a Lieutenant in the Tyrolean Imperial Hunters (Tiroler Kaiserjäger Regiment No. 4), Bilgeri instituted ski training in the high Alps as early as 1896 and became the creator of mountain and ski training in the Austro-Hungarian army. Bilgeri led military patrols in winter treks in the Zillertal Alps (1899) and to Kitzbühel (1905). From 1905-08 he led instructor courses for officers. Bilgeri directed a military ski factory in Salzburg from 1906-10. In 1908-09 he was a commander of border guards in the Dolomites. He was an officer of the World War I National Defense Command in Tyrol, leading the formation and training of the Mountain guide companies. He retired in 1920 with the rank of Lieutnant Colonel, and later was awarded Colonel.

Alpine ski instructor
He provided free ski instruction in Austria (starting 1906), Sweden, Switzerland, Hungary and Turkey and wrote an early ski manual advocating the use of two shorter ski poles, Der alpine Skilauf (1910). Bilgeri was involved with the creation of the Salzburg Ski Club in 1910. Starting in 1919 he was a member of the Swiss Alpine Club. He devised improvements to mountain boot shoelace fasteners, crampons, ice axes, anti-slip skins, collapsible ski poles, ski wax, ski bindings, rucksacks, and crevasse rescue. He provided ski training for the police and customs starting in 1921. The first Alpine manual for the Austrian gendarmerie was published in 1927, which had been developed by Bilgeri and Colonel Josef Albert. In 1930 he founded a ski school at Patscherkofel in the Tyrol.

Works 
Der alpine Skilauf München: Deutsche Alpenzeitung, 1910 

Alpine Weisungen für den Gebirgskrieg Verlag K. u. K. Landesverteidigungs-Kondo in Tirol, 1917

Alpin-Vorschrift für die österr. Bundesgendarmerie: nebst einem Anhang über die Zentralmeldestelle für alpine Unfälle in Wien und der Instruktion für alpine Rettungspatrouillen des Bundesheeres Wien: Gendarmerie-Zentraldirektion, 1927

Méthode Bilgeri pour l'Enseignement du Ski Swiss Alpine Club Lausanne: F. Rouge & Cie S.A., 1931

Alpiner Skilauf Skihochtouren Bregenz: Bilgeri-Werk, 1934

Legacy 

 Popularized Alpine skiing through his teaching, providing instruction to reportedly more than 40,000 pupils
 1926 awarded Golden Badge of Honor from the Swedish Ski Association
 1927 Honorary member of Ski Club of Great Britain
 1937 memorial stone erected at Patscherkofel
 1984 commemorative plaque at his birthplace

The following have been named after him:

 Crevasse rescue technique using multiple ropes
 Bilgeri Glacier in Grahamland Antarctica
  
 Hauptmann-Bilgeri-Steig trail on Monte Piano in the Dolomites
 Innsbruck-Igls, Bregenz street and hotel as well as roads in Horbranz, Voralberg and Mariazell, Styria
 1950 challenge trophy in cross-country skiing
 1959 Georg-Bilgeri-Straße in Vienna Donaustadt (22nd district)

See also
Mathias Zdarsky
Luis Trenker

References

External links 
Vorarlberg Military Museum

Bilgeri objekte at Historical Alpine Archive

Bibliography at alpinwiki.at

1873 births
1934 deaths
People from Bregenz
Austro-Hungarian military personnel of World War I
Austrian alpine skiers
Austrian mountain climbers
Austro-Hungarian Army officers